Events from the year 1963 in Denmark.

Incumbents
 Monarch – Frederick IX
 Prime minister – Jens Otto Krag

Events

Sports

Badminton
 1923 March  All England Badminton Championships
 Erland Kops wins gold in Men's Single
 Finn Kobberø and Jørgen Hammergaard Hansen win gold in Men's Double
 Finn Kobberø and Ulla Strand win gold medal in Mixed Double.

Football
 18 December – Denmark qualifies for the final tournament of the 1964 European Nations' Cup in France by defeating Luxemburg in the second round of the 1964 European Nations' Cup qualifying.

Births
 26 February – Jan Friis-Mikkelsen, chef and restaurateur
 7 April – Fredrik Lundin, jazz saxophonist
 14 July – Jan Mølby, football player, football coach
 3 October – Niels Lan Doky, jazz pianist, record producer
 18 November – Peter Schmeichel, footballer
 26 December – Lars Ulrich, drummer, co-founder of Metallica

Deaths
 20 February – Jacob Gade, violinist and composer (born in 1879)
 14 April – Anna Borg, Danish-Icelandic actress (born in 1903)
 3 July – Povl Baumann, architect (born in 1888)

See also
1963 in Danish television

References

 
Denmark
Years of the 20th century in Denmark
1960s in Denmark